Anison Covers is an upcoming cover album by Hiroko Moriguchi, to be released by Sonic Blade on May 24, 2023. The album features 11 anime theme songs covered in jazz, acoustic, and bossa nova. It will be offered in two editions: CD only and CD with Blu-ray.

Track listing

Personnel 
 Naoko Terai – violin (track 1)
 Mikio Sakai – piano (track 2)
 Kotaro Oshio – acoustic guitar (track 3)
 Satoru Shionoya – piano (track 5)
 Satoshi Takebe – keyboards (track 6)
 Yasuhiko Akasaka (track 7)
 Marty Friedman – guitar (track 8)

References

External links 
 (King Records)

2023 albums
Hiroko Moriguchi albums
Covers albums
Japanese-language albums
King Records (Japan) albums